Rhagastis lambertoni is a moth of the family Sphingidae. It is known from Madagascar.

The length of the forewings is 22–30 mm. It can be distinguished from all other Rhagastis species by the strongly convex outer margin and markedly falcate apex of the forewing.

References

Rhagastis
Moths described in 1923
Moths of Madagascar
Moths of Africa